is a collection of Japanese light novels by Aoi Sekina, with illustrations by Kira Inugami. The series started with the release of the first volume on January 19, 2008, published by Fujimi Shobo under their Fujimi Fantasia Bunko label. Originally the series was called , but was later changed to the subtitle of the first volume, .

Plot
The student council members of Hekiyou Academy in Hokkaidō are selected by a popularity contest. As a result, the members are usually a group of pretty girls. The sole male member is Ken Sugisaki, who entered the student council by becoming the top-scoring student in the level which he had to cram to achieve.

The story (as written in the series) has a metafiction component where, under the student council president Sakurano Kurimu orders, vice president Ken Sugisaki has to write stories to show the other students how brilliant the student council is. Ken negotiates with Fujimi Shobo to publish these stories. The author himself likens the series to that of a yonkoma novel which portrays the characters having comical conversations and parodying otaku culture.

Characters

Hekiyou Academy student council

Ken is a 2nd Year student and holds the Student Council "Blue Chip" Seat for Vice-President - Valedictorian. He entered the student council as the top-scoring student in his year; the highest scoring student has a choice to be in the student council. He had to work hard to improve his score, being in the lowest score bracket when he enrolled. He loves playing eroge and bishōjo games, and plans on making the rest of the student council members his "harem". On the surface, he seems to be lazy and carefree, but he is actually very hardworking and always stays behind after dismissal to finish all the student council work so that the student council can have fun as always. Ken also has a serious side to him, and he truly cares for those around him; According to Kurimu, they have yet to find someone who dislikes Ken. Ken reveals to Lilicia that the student council itself is his "dream", where his goals and happiness co-exist.

A unique trivia about Ken is that he starts every episode with behavior that exasperates the other members of the student council, but at the end of each episode Ken always shows his serious side, making the other members of the student council grateful to him. Ken was bullied in the past by his classmates during middle school despite his apparent happiness and two-timed two girls, he even asked to be bullied in middle school. In contrast to his active self in the student council, Ken was often isolated socially in middle school. In the last episode, it is revealed that he met all of the girls in the current student council throughout the year before joining, one in each season. Each of the four girls changed his life in some way for the better and help create the perverse and goofy, but kind and hard-working person that he is now. It's because of those encounters that he strove to be in the student council for the sole purpose of repaying them by making all four of the girls happy. Currently, Sugisaki and Kurimu are dating at the present story.

Kurimu is a senior in Hekiyou Academy and is the president of the student council. She has an extreme sweet tooth, and has a pink/reddish hair. Her nickname can also mean . This is often used as a joke against her in the series, poking fun of her childish size and looks, despite being a senior. However, acting childish around Chizuru does not seem to bother her. She is well-liked by most of the other students. Most of the episodes start out with Kurimu making a statement in front of a whiteboard. She is the cause of most of Ken's labor and why he became an eroge maniac.

Kurimu and Ken met in the spring (桜野 = field of cherry blossoms) when she was Vice President at the time, Ken decided to help her carry boxes. He asked for her help in becoming a better person, and Kurimu suggested playing a dating sim game as she said that the main character's job is to make everyone happy. Their meeting gave him a goal in mind and taught him to look towards the future. Like the season she represents, she's often the first to suggest something and is always looking towards the bigger picture in mind. She has a very large ego calling herself the best student council in the world, and that she is destined to be a god. She is very childish, but has an arrogant self-image, thinking she has F-size breasts and is 170 cm tall and her clothes make her look small. She is also not very mature for her age. The anime suggests that she has feelings for Ken. Currently, Sugisaki and Kurimu are dating in the present story.

Chizuru is the Secretary of the Student Council. She has a tall and model-like figure. She is a mature woman who seems to spend most of her time being quite serious. However, she has a sadistic side to her, which is shown when she "brain-washes" Ken and Kurimu. Also, she makes a lot of references to her sadism in the anime. She loves to cuddle and "abuse" the President (Kurimu) in a little sister's way and is an avid reader. Sometimes, it is hinted towards her wanting to be involved with Kurimu. She is hinted towards having a couple of part-time jobs despite being too young legally to even have a job. While she is identified as the cool, serious type, she can embrace her more cutesy side to her once hopping around dressed as a cute sheep.

Chizuru and Ken met in autumn when Ken was suffering from a broken heart. Their meeting healed it and showed her compassion for others. Like the season she represents, she always seems a bit gloomy and hard to approach but has a certain elegance to her. In middle school, she was bullied by her best friend. As her friend was scared of losing Chizuru's friendship, she attempted to isolate Chizuru. The bullying created emotional scars that were later healed by the student council. Chizuru states she is not a morning person, with her hugging Kurimu in the morning. She is very manipulative, able to control Kurimu and Ken. She calls Ken her slave and even sets the ringtone to repeat "my slave" when he calls. In the anime, she is hinted to have feelings for Ken. In the novel, it appears her feelings grow to the point of being nervous around Ken.

Minatsu is a bold character and Student Council Vice-president. A tomboy with impressive athletic skills, and is surprisingly also good in math, which Ken considers to be uncharacteristic of her. She's popular among girls and has a bit of a yuri taste. She's in the same class with Ken but she's an orthodox tsundere without any 'dere' (short for ) to be found. She also has a little sister, Mafuyu. She is very protective of Mafuyu and despises anyone who tries to hurt her. She is into a lot of shōnen manga as most of her suggestions tend to be based on typical shōnen manga plots.

Minatsu and Ken met in the summer. Due to how she was, he looked up to her and to be like her, but she told him that he should not aim to be like her but to aim for the impossible. Their meeting taught him not to be lazy and work if he desires something. Like the season she represents, she is fired up and is always ready to take action, especially when it has something to do with anime or manga. Both Minatsu and Mafuyu never got to know their father, and Minatsu was unwilling to meet her mothers' boyfriend saying it had nothing to do with them, creating a rift between Minatsu and her mother, but their mother always took care of them no matter how tired she was. In the anime and novel, her feelings for Ken grow so much that she is aware that she's in love with Ken. She is seen kissing him in volume 8 of the light novel and episode 4 of the second season of the anime.

Mafuyu is the Student Council Treasurer, Minatsu's sister, and the only freshman in the Council. She is a swaying bishōjo and is afraid of males (though she lightens up to Ken). Ken thought her to be "the easiest character to see the ending" but later turns out to be the most feared one by some reason, even when compared to Chizuru, particularly the fact that she's a fujoshi, and that she fantasizes pairing Ken romantically with a boy named Nakameguro she writing (who turns out to be an actual person). When it comes to boys' love, Mafuyu can actually be just as perverted, if not worse, than Ken. She's addicted to video games and spends much of her free time playing with a handheld game console that resembles a pink PlayStation Portable.

Mafuyu and Ken met in the winter chatting online with him as Yuki (with Ken as Key) and even having a more spirited personality online. Ken fell asleep once in the snow and, despite her fear of men, Mafuyu took him out of the freezing cold. Their meeting showed him a clear understanding of what strength really is. Like the season she represents, she's extremely passive and keeps a lot to herself, but she will show her real self and her real feelings if she feels comfortable. Despite her shy personality (or based on Ken's logic, because she is shy) she confesses her love to Ken, although she says she just wanted to share her feelings with him rather than start a relationship, because she loves the Student Council's atmosphere most of all, implying that even when she loves him she doesn't want to change how things are at the moment.

Satori is a teacher of Japanese and an advisor of the Student Council. She is also one of the primary characters of the author's previous work "Material Ghost".

Transfer student who was elected to the new President of the Student Council.

New Vice-president of the Student Council.

New Treasurer of the Student Council. Though her number of votes in the popularity poll was sixth place, she was awarded the election since Ringo Sugisaki and Rie Shiraki, the fourth place and the fifth place, declined.

New Secretary of the Student Council. Since she always wears a mask, there are few students who have ever seen her face before. But the students who noticed that she was extremely cute unanimously voted for her.

Students

Lilicia is the President of the Journalism Club, and ranked fifth in the school's popularity poll; just falling short of getting into the Student Council. Lilicia and Kurimu are constantly at loggerheads. Lilicia also seems to be extremely afraid of Chizuru. She claims that she despises the current Student Council because they always laze around, doing nothing. She constantly targets Ken for her attacks toward the Student Council for being a two-timing individual, though her sister Elise states that it is because she likes him. Despite her repeated attempts to slander the Student Council, she has mutual respect for them.

Ken and Minatsu's classmate. She is cute but failed to garner votes in the popularity poll due to defects in her character. Subsequently, she became an idol to show them what she could do. She made a film with Ken starring in it, to which the audio from the film was misunderstood by the girls of the student council about Ken's identity.

Meguru's younger brother. He has a crush on Minatsu but she does not notice his feelings.
Meguru and Mamoru are called "" by classmates from their surname.

Nakameguro is Ken and Minatsu's classmate. He transferred to Hekiyou Academy since he was bullied by his classmates at the previous school. He likes Ken better than pushy Space Siblings but Ken does not want to become too close to him because he has the same surname as the character of Mafuyu's BL novels by coincidence as well as looking identical to her pictures of her character.

New President of the Journalism Club.

Other characters

Lilicia's younger sister. She spent time with Ken at school as part of her sister's plan to dig up information on the student council. Afterward, she states that Ken already knew why she was there and played with her anyway. Because of that, she has taken a liking to Ken, and she addresses him as "nii-sama". She is also quite mature for her age (especially when it comes to "adult" matters) and pretty smart, even managing to get a tough math problem right before Kurimu did.

A made-up Ken's older brother from Minatsu's Fantasy and Mafuyu also uses the character in her fantasy.

Ken's step-sister. Very innocent and loves her brother very much to the point of wanting to marry him.

Ken's childhood friend and former girlfriend. She is also close to Ringo.

Media

Light novel

Manga
A manga adaptation by 10mo started serialization in Fujimi Shobo's shōnen manga magazine Dragon Age Pure on August 20, 2008. Another manga adaptation by Sorahiko Mizushima started serialization in Kadokawa Shoten's Comptiq magazine on May 9, 2009. On December 24, 2014, KADOKAWA released the English digital volumes of the manga series on BookWalker, their official eBook store.

Anime
A 12-episode anime series adaptation produced by Studio Deen, written by Jukki Hanada, and directed by Takuya Satō aired in Japan between October 2 and December 18, 2009. A second season titled Seitokai no Ichizon Lv.2 aired in Japan on the Nico Live section of Nico Nico Douga between October 13 and December 15, 2012. Lv.2 was produced by AIC, written by Reiko Yoshida, and directed by Ken'ichi Imaizumi.

Seitokai no Ichizon (2009)

Seitokai no Ichizon Lv.2 (2012)

Seitokai no Shukujitsu (OVA 2013)

Music
Opening themes
 "Treasure" - .
 "Precious"
Ending themes
  -  (ep 1)
  -  (ep 2)
  - , vice president & treasurer (ep 3)
  - (ep 4)
  - , president & secretary (ep 5)
  -  (ep 6)
  -  (ep 7)
  - , vice president & treasurer (ep 8)
  -  (ep 9)
  - , president & secretary (ep 10)
  -  (ep 11)
  -  (ep 12

Reception

See also
Gamers! - Another light novel series with the same creator

References

External links
Official anime website  

2008 Japanese novels
2008 manga
2009 anime television series debuts
2012 anime television series debuts
2012 Japanese novels
Anime and manga based on light novels
Anime International Company
Fujimi Fantasia Bunko
Fujimi Shobo manga
Japanese high school television series
Kadokawa Dwango franchises
Kadokawa Shoten manga
Light novels
School life in anime and manga
Sentai Filmworks
Shōnen manga
Slice of life anime and manga
Studio Deen
Tokyo MX original programming